Mirocastnia pyrrhopygoides is a moth in the Castniidae family. It is found in Ecuador, Peru and Colombia.

The length of the forewings is 26.6-34.5 mm for males and about 29 mm for females. They mimic Pythonides limaea.

References

Moths described in 1917
Castniidae